The Horti Aciliorum were gardens in the city of Rome, created in the 2nd century on the Pincian Hill, between the Porta Pinciana and what is now the Spanish Steps.

History
Surrounded to the north, west and east by opus reticulatum retaining walls built along the slopes of the hill – the northern and eastern walls were later incorporated into the Aurelian Walls and so can be partially reconstructed – the northern part is the famous 'Muro Torto'. It was shaped as a wide semicircle, opening to the west, with a staircase leading down to the plain below to the north of the present-day Spanish Steps. It included a two-section piscina connected to a cistern, consisting of a maze of small tunnels dug into the rock – the hill in the gardens of the current Villa Medici was built on the ruins of the 'Parnassus', an octagonal nymphaeum.

The gardens belonged to the Anicii Glabriones, who had them built. In the 4th century they passed to the gens Pincia then to Anicia Faltonia Proba and her husband Sextus Petronius Probus, before finally becoming state property.

See also
Roman gardens

References

Aciliorum
+